The Chronicon (Chronicle) or Temporum liber (Book of Times) was a universal chronicle written by Jerome. It was one of his earliest attempts at history. It was composed c. 380 in Constantinople; this is a translation into Latin of the chronological tables which compose the second part of the Chronicon of Eusebius, with a supplement covering the period from 325 to 379. Despite numerous errors taken from Eusebius, and some of his own, Jerome produced a valuable work of universal history, if only for the example which it gave to such later chroniclers as Prosper of Aquitaine, Cassiodorus, and Victor of Tunnuna to continue his annals. In conformity with the Chronicon of Eusebius (early 4th century), Jerome dated Creation to 5201 BC.

The Chronicle includes a chronology of the events of Greek mythology, based on the work of Hellenistic scholars such as Apollodorus, Diodorus Siculus, and Eusebius. While the earlier parts are obviously unhistorical, there may be scattered remnants of historical events of late Mycenean Greece from entries of the 12th century BC. (See the historicity of the Iliad. Notably, Jerome's date for the capture of Troy of 1183 BC corresponds remarkably well with the destruction layer of Troy VIIa, the main candidate for the historical inspiration of legendary Troy, dated to c. 1190 BC.) Homer himself is dated to 940 BC, while modern scholarship usually dates him after 800 BC.

Timeline
From Adam until the 14th year of Valens (AD 377), 5,579 years; this places Adam in 5201 BC

From Abraham to the capture of Troy (26 kings of the Assyrians), 835 years
Ninus, son of Belus reigned 52 years, Abraham, Zoroaster
Semiramis, 42 years
Zameis, 38 years; covenant of Abraham with God (1942 BC)
Arius reigned for 30 years; birth of Isaac (1912 BC)
Aralius, 40 years
Xerxes Balaneus , 30 years; Inachus reigned for 50 years (1856 BC)
Armamitres, 38 years
Belocus, 35 years; birth of Joseph (1765 BC); Ogygian Flood (1757 BC)
Balaeus, 52 years; famine in Egypt (1727 BC)
Altadas, 32 years; Prometheus
Mamynthus, 30 years
Magchaleus, 30 years
Sphaerus, 20 years; birth of Moses (1592 BC)
Mamylus, 30 years
Sparetus, 40 years; Deucalian flood (1526 BC)
Ascatades, 40 years; Moses on Mount Sinai (1515 BC)
Amynthes, 45 years; birth of Minos, Rhadamanthus, and Sarpedon (1445 BC)
Belochus, 25 years
Bellepares, 30 years; Perseus
Lamprides, 32 years; Tros (1365 BC)
Sosares, 20 years; Pegasus
Lampares, 30 years; Europa, temple at Eleusis
Pannias, 45 years; Miletus; Argonauts; Oedipus; Gideon
Sosarmus, 19 years; Hercules, Priam, Theseus, the war of the Seven against Thebes (1234 BC)
Mithraeus, 27 years; Olympic games (1212 BC)
Tautanes, 32 years; Trojan War (1191-1182 BC)
From the capture of Troy until the first Olympiad, 406 years.
from Ninus to Sardanapalus: 36 Assyrian kings (1240 years)
from the first Olympiad, to the 14th year of Valens, 1,155 years
1st Olympiad (776 BC)
65th Olympiad; Darius the Great (520 BC)
181st Olympiad; Julius Caesar (44 BC)
202nd Olympiad; preaching of Jesus Christ
289th Olympiad; Goths defeated by Huns (AD 377)

See also
Ages of Man
Mesopotamia in Classical literature
Timeline of Ancient Greece

Notes

References
 Richard W. Burgess, Studies in Eusebian and post-Eusebian Chronography, Stuttgart (1999).
 Malcolm Drew Donalson, A Translation of Jerome's Chronicon With Historical Commentary, Mellen University Press (1996). .
 J. K. Fotheringham, The Bodleian Manuscript of Jerome's Version of the Chronicle of Eusebius Reproduced in Collotype. Oxford: Clarendon (1905)
 J. K. Fotheringham, Eusebii Pamphili Chronici canones. London: Humphrey Milford (1923).
 R. Helm, Eusebius Werke 7: Die Chronik des Hieronymus, Die Griechischen Christlichen Schriftsteller der Ersten Jahrhunderte 47 (1956).
 Benoît Jean-Jean & Bertrand Lançon, Saint-Jérôme, Chronique : Continuation de la Chronique d'Eusèbe, années 326-378, Brest, (2004), .
Josef Karst, Eusebius Werke, 5. Band : Die Chronik aus dem Armenischen übersetzt. Die Griechischen Christlichen Schriftsteller der Ersten Jahrhunderte 20 (1911).
 Alden A. Mosshammer, The Chronicle of Eusebius and the Greek Chronographic Tradition, Lewisburg/London (1979), .
 Alfred Schoene, Eusebi Chronicorum Libri. 2 vols. Berlin: Weidmann (1875).
 Robert Graves, The Greek Myths (1955), 
 Alden A. Mosshammer, The Chronicle of Eusebius and Greek Chronographic Tradition, Bucknell University Press (1979), 
 J. C. Stobart, The Glory that Was Greece (1911), 
 Michael Wood (1998), In Search of the Trojan War, 
 Michael Wood (2005), In Search of Myths and Heroes http://www.bbc.co.uk/history/ancient/greeks/jason_01.shtml

External links
 2005 online edition (tertullian.org)
 introduction
 prefaces
 part 1 Abraham to Babylonian captivity
 part 2 Xerxes  to AD 379
 Merton manuscript facsimile of Merton College ms.
 Chronological tables

4th-century history books
Chronicles
Classical Latin literature
Greek literature (post-classical)
Hellenistic historiography
4th-century Christian texts
Patristic historical writings
Works by Jerome
4th-century Latin books
References on Greek mythology